This is a list of bridges and other crossings of the Kootenay River from its source downstream to the Columbia River.

Crossings

See also

 List of crossings of the Columbia River
 List of British Columbia-related topics
 List of Montana-related topics
 List of Idaho-related topics

References

crossings
Kootenay River crossings
Kootenay River crossings
Kootenay River
Lists of river crossings in Idaho